Hae-il is a Korean masculine given name. The meaning differs based on the hanja used to write the name. There are 23 hanja with the reading "hae" and 10 hanja with the reading "il" on the South Korean government's official list of hanja which may be used in given names.

People with this given name include:
 Cho Hae-il (born 1941 as Cho Hae-ryong), South Korean writer
 Nam Hae-il (born 1948), South Korean naval officer, 25th Chief of Naval Operations
 Park Hae-il (born 1977), South Korean actor

See also
List of Korean given names

References

Korean masculine given names